Russ Ingalls is an American politician from the state of Vermont. A member of the Republican Party, he has represented the Essex-Orleans district in the Vermont Senate since 2021. In 2022, he was reelected to the newly created Essex district. He previously served on the Irasburg Board of Selectmen. Ingalls is the clerk of the Senate Committee on Institutions and also serves on the Senate Committee on Transportation and the Canvassing Committee. He was born in Japan and spent much of his early life traveling with his father, who was in the U.S. Navy. He has worked in the dairy supply, real estate, and automobile sales industries.

References

Living people
Republican Party Vermont state senators
21st-century American politicians
Year of birth missing (living people)